"Turn the Music Louder (Rumble)" is a song recorded by British DJ KDA. It is a re-working of his instrumental hit "Rumble" and it features vocals from rapper Tinie Tempah and singer Katy B. The song was released as a digital download on 16 October 2015 by Ministry of Sound. The song was written by Tempah and Katy B and produced by KDA. On 23 October 2015, the song debuted at number one on the UK Singles Chart, becoming Tempah's seventh single to do so and KDA and Katy B's first. The song appeared on Katy B's third studio album Honey (2016), in a version without Tinie Tempah's vocals.

Release
The song premiered on 2 September 2015, and was released for digital download as a single on iTunes on 16 October 2015. A digital EP, which includes the song's extended mix, instrumental and two remixes by Armand Van Helden, was also released on 16 October 2015.

Music video
A music video to accompany the release of "Turn the Music Louder (Rumble)" was first released onto YouTube on 7 October 2015 at a total length of three minutes and twenty-five seconds.

In popular culture
The song was featured on the soundtrack of the 2016 video game Forza Horizon 3.

Track listing
Digital download – single
"Turn the Music Louder (Rumble)" (featuring Tinie Tempah and Katy B) (Radio Edit) – 3:21

Digital download – EP
"Turn the Music Louder (Rumble)" (featuring Tinie Tempah and Katy B) (Extended Mix) – 6:18
"Turn the Music Louder (Rumble)" (featuring Tinie Tempah and Katy B) (Armand Van Helden Tribal Tattoo Mix) – 6:19
"Turn the Music Louder (Rumble)" (featuring Tinie Tempah and Katy B) (Armand Van Helden Do Voodoo Mix) – 5:12
"Turn the Music Louder (Rumble)" (featuring Tinie Tempah and Katy B) (Instrumental) – 6:18

Charts and certifications

Charts

Certifications

Release history

References

External links

2015 singles
2015 songs
Tinie Tempah songs
Katy B songs
Songs written by Tinie Tempah
Songs written by Katy B
UK Singles Chart number-one singles